Khalid Khan (born 7 February 1971) is a Hong Kong international cricketer who has played two One Day Internationals and two first class matches for Hong Kong. He is a seam bowler who has been named at 10 or 11 in the batting order, making a total of five international runs, but he has also got three wickets in official internationals - those of Khaled Mashud and both Pakistani openers, Imran Nazir and Imran Farhat, at the 2004 Asia Cup.

Khan's first class cricket career began on 24 April 2005 in Sharjah against the United Arab Emirates, where he took a wicket with his third ball, dismissing Asghar Ali lbw. In his next over, number three Fahad Usman was bowled, but his next wicket came two hours later, with the number 11 Rizwan Latif bowled as the UAE were bowled out for 127, the same score that Hong Kong had made in the first innings, where Khan had hit his first boundary before he was bowled by Latif. Despite a second innings total of 184, however, Hong Kong failed to defend the total as Khan only got one more wicket - Asghar Ali lbw again.

In his next match against Nepal rain struck to shorten the match to 78 overs in three days, and Khan bowled 11 of those without reward, but he did make a career highest score of nine runs from number 11 - an unbeaten score.

References 

 

1971 births
Living people
Hong Kong cricketers
Hong Kong One Day International cricketers
Pakistani emigrants to Hong Kong
Cricketers from Attock
Sportspeople of Pakistani descent